"Lakewood" Louie is an American poker player best known for his success at the World Series of Poker (WSOP) in the late 1970s and early 1980s.

Louie started playing in tournaments at the World Series of Poker in the 1970s. He won four WSOP championship bracelets and also cashed in four events at the World Series, meaning that he ended up winning every tournament at the WSOP that he played in, when he cashed.

He is credited as being the first player in the history of the WSOP to table a royal flush, which took place during the 1979 Main Event. Professional George Huber was the man on the losing end of the historic hand.

Louie won his first WSOP bracelet in the 1978 $5,000 Draw High event, winning $21,000. In 1979, he won two bracelets, one in $1,000 Ace to Five Draw and one in $2,000 Draw High. Louie won his fourth bracelet in 1980 in the $1,000 Razz event. His total tournament winnings at the World Series of Poker exceed $100,000.

World Series of Poker bracelets

Notes

American poker players
World Series of Poker bracelet winners
Year of birth missing (living people)
Living people